Vincenzo Maria Righini (22 January 1756 – 19 August 1812) was an Italian composer, singer and kapellmeister.

Life and career 
Righini was born in Bologna and studied singing and composition with Padre Martini in his home town. Initially he performed as a singer in Florence (1769) and Rome (1770), however, according to Fétis he made his debut as a tenor in Parma in 1775. His opera buffa La vedova scaltra, considered his first contribution to musical theatre, was performed in 1774 at the Prague theatre "V kotcích". From 1774 to 1777 Righini worked in Prague, as a member of the theatre ensemble of Giuseppe Bustelli. He composed and staged operas to the libretti of N. Porta. At the end of 1777 he moved to Vienna, where he was engaged as a music teacher and composer. His comic operas were often performed in the Burgtheater. In 1787 he replaced Antonio Salieri as the court kapellmeister for a brief period, Salieri stayed in Paris during that time. In 1787 Righini also moved to Mainz, where he became a court kapellmeister of the Electoral orchestra for the elector Friedrich Karl Joseph von Erthal. In March, 1793, he was appointed the Royal Prussian court kapellmeister and he led the operation of theatres in Berlin and Potsdam. He also composed grand operas for local theatres, often to the libretti of Antonio De' Filistri. He died in Bologna.
Beethoven wrote Vierundzwanzig Variationen über die Ariette „Venni Amore“ von Vincenzo Righini  in D-Dur WoO 65.

Works 
Righini is the creator of the second opera on the theme of Don Giovanni, composed for the Prague stage. He is considered a skillful, but not very original composer, who often took advantage of the innovations of other composers. His Don Giovanni was performed in 1997 at the Dejvické divadlo in Prague, and in 2003 at the Městské divadlo in Brno.

Selected operas
La vedova scaltra (1774)
La bottegha del caffe osia Il maldicènte (1776)
Il convitato di pietra osia Il dissoluto (1777)
La merope
Armida (1782)
L'incontro inaspettato (1785)
Il Demogorgone ovvero Il filosofo confuso (1786)
Enea del Lazio (1793)
Il trionfo d'Arianna (1793)
Tigrane (1795)
La selva incantata (1803)

Notes

References

External links
 

1756 births
1812 deaths
18th-century Italian composers
18th-century Italian male opera singers
19th-century Italian male opera singers
Italian male classical composers
Italian opera composers
Italian operatic tenors
Male opera composers
Musicians from Bologna